Susan Indiaba Wokoma (born 31 December 1987 in Peckham, London, England) is a British actress, writer and director. She is best known for her roles as Edith in Enola Holmes and Raquel in the E4/Netflix show Crazyhead. Wokoma was listed as one of Europe's Forbes 30 Under 30 in 2017 and named a BAFTA Breakthrough Brit by an international jury the same year.

Early life and education 
Wokoma was born on 31 December 1987, in London; her parents are Kalabari from Rivers State in South South East Nigeria. Her mother worked as a cleaner, and her father worked multiple jobs. He died in 2012.

Wokoma made her television debut at 14 as a participant in CBBC's Serious Jungle in 2002. She was also a member of The National Youth Theatre, making her professional acting debut in the BAFTA-winning That Summer Day.

She has a bachelor's degree in acting from the Royal Academy of Dramatic Art, graduating in 2010.

Career
Since graduating, her television appearances have included Phoebe Waller-Bridge's debut television show Crashing as well as the film adaptation of Half of a Yellow Sun and The Inbetweeners 2. Her theatre work includes productions at the Royal Court, Bush Theatre, Almeida Theatre, The Royal National Theatre, Donmar Warehouse and St. Ann's Warehouse in New York. In 2017 she made her West End theatre debut alongside Martin Freeman and Tamsin Greig in the premiere of the Olivier award-winning comedy Labour of Love by James Graham at the Noël Coward Theatre in London.

In 2017 Wokoma won the RTS Best On-Screen Performance award for Crazyhead. In 2016 she won Best Supporting Actor at the BBC Audio Drama Awards for her performance in the radio adaptation of Marie NDiaye's Three Strong Women. Wokoma is the voice of Princess Talanji in World of Warcraft: Battle for Azeroth, the seventh expansion of the popular World of Warcraft game. Wokoma wrote, starred and associate produced the Sky comedy short Love The Sinner. Love The Sinner went on in 2019 to be screened at the BFI London Film Festival and was longlisted for the British Independent Film Awards in the British Short Film category.

Wokoma co-wrote an episode (alongside Shaun Pye) of Romesh Ranganathan’s sitcom The Reluctant Landlord (Series 2), also for Sky. She was in the writers' room for the second series of the Netflix original series Sex Education.

In 2019 she starred in the Channel 4 and IFC comedy Year of the Rabbit alongside Matt Berry and Freddie Fox. In June and July 2019 she played Bottom in A Midsummer Night's Dream at Regent's Park Open Air Theatre in London. The Daily Telegraph said of her performance "All are terrific and Susan Wokoma sheer bliss, delivering one of the most endearing and effortlessly funny Bottoms I've ever seen". In October 2020, Wokoma starred in the Amazon Studios comedy Truth Seekers and joined the cast of the feature film adaptation of Enola Holmes alongside Millie Bobby Brown, Henry Cavill and Helena Bonham Carter. Wokoma had a leading role in the BBC drama Cheaters. In May 2022, Wokoma started directing her first feature film, Three Weeks, which she also wrote and is starring in.

Filmography

Film

Television

Video Games

References

External links

Susan Wokoma | Actress – BAFTA, October 2017

Living people
1987 births
21st-century British actresses
21st-century English women
21st-century English people
Actresses from London
Alumni of RADA
Black British actresses
English film actresses
English people of Nigerian descent
English television actresses
English video game actresses
English voice actresses
National Youth Theatre members
People from Southwark